Vegan organic (or veganic) agriculture is the organic production of food and other crops with minimal animal inputs. Vegan organic agriculture is the organic form of animal-free agriculture.

Animal-free farming methods use no animal products or by-products, such as bloodmeal, fish products, bone meal, feces, or other animal-origin matter because the production of these materials is viewed as either harming animals directly, or as associated with the exploitation and consequent suffering of animals. Some of these materials are by-products of animal husbandry, created during the process of cultivating animals for the production of meat, milk, skins, furs, entertainment, labor, or companionship. The sale of such by-products decreases expenses and increases profit for those engaged in animal husbandry and therefore helps support the animal husbandry industry, an outcome most vegans find unacceptable.

Vegan organic farming is much less common than organic farming. In 2019, there were 63 self-declared vegan organic farms in the United States, and 16,585 certified organic farms.

Veganic gardening
The veganic gardening method is a distinct system developed by Rosa Dalziel O'Brien, Kenneth Dalziel O'Brien and May E. Bruce, although the term was originally coined by Geoffrey Rudd as a contraction of vegetable organic in order to "denote a clear distinction between conventional chemical-based systems and organic ones based on animal manures". The O'Brien system's principal argument is that animal manures are harmful to soil health rather than that their use involves exploitation of and cruelty to animals.

The system employs very specific techniques including the addition of straw and other vegetable wastes to the soil in order to maintain soil fertility. Gardeners following the system use soil-covering mulches, and employ non-compacting surface cultivation techniques using any short-handled, wide-bladed, hand hoe. They kneel when surface cultivating, placing a board under their knees to spread out the pressure, and prevent soil compaction. Kenneth Dalziel O'Brien published a description of his system in Veganic Gardening, the Alternative System for Healthier Crops:

Before the term veganic was created, economist and simple living advocate Scott Nearing gave a speech at the 1953 World Vegetarian Congress in Sigtuna, Sweden, with a title of "Food without Animal Residues".

Practices
Vegan organic growers maintain soil fertility using green manures, cover crops, green wastes, composted vegetable matter, and minerals. Some vegan gardeners may supplement this with human urine from vegans (which provides nitrogen) and 'humanure' from vegans, produced from compost toilets.

Farms certified as biocyclic vegan use preventative methods to manage insects. If these fail, however, the label allows them to use insecticides such as Bacillus thuringiensis, which starves larvae to death.

Certification and promotion 
The Biocyclic Vegan Standard is an IFOAM-accredited organic standard for vegan organic farms. It is awarded by BNS Biocyclic Network Services Ltd (a Cypriot company), and has accredited 21 farms in Europe . The German Environment Agency awarded the German biocyclic vegan association some 60,000 euros for the promotion of the biocyclic vegan standard from 2021 to 2022.

, 19 farms in the United Kingdom and Ireland are certified vegan organic by the Stockfree Organic label. Farms wanting to obtain the label are certified by the Soil Association, and the label's requirements are determined by the Vegan Organic Network.

See also

 Animal-free agriculture
 Climate-friendly gardening
 Deep ecology
 Environmental vegetarianism
 Plants for a Future

Notes

References and further reading
 Growing Green: Organic Techniques for a Sustainable Future by Jenny Hall and Iain Tolhurst. Vegan Organic Network publishing, 2006, . Available in the US from Chelsea Green Publishing, .
 Growing Our Own: A Guide to Vegan Gardening by Kathleen Jannaway. Movement for Compassionate Living publishing, 1987. ASIN B001OQ7G8S.
 Plants for a Future: Edible and Useful Plants for a Healthier World by Ken Fern. Hampshire: Permanent Publications, 1997. .
 Veganic Gardening- The Alternative System for Healthier Crops by Kenneth Dalziel O'Brien. Thorsons Publishing, 1986, .
Will Bonsall’s Essential Guide to Radical, Self-reliant Gardening: Innovative Techniques for Growing Vegetables, Grains, and Perennial Food Crops with Minimal Fossil Fuel and Animal Inputs by Will Bonsall. Chelsea Green Publishing. 2015. .

 
Permaculture
Ethical schools and movements

lt:Veganiška žemdirbystė